170th Street may refer to:

170 Street, Edmonton, Alberta, Canada

New York City Subway stations
170th Street (IRT Jerome Avenue Line); serving the  train
170th Street (IND Concourse Line); serving the  trains